Fulvio Galimi (11 January 1927 – 3 June 2016) was an Argentine fencer who practiced all three weapons: foil, épée and sabre. He competed at the 1948 and 1952 Summer Olympics. He earned a silver medal in the individual foil event at the 1951 Pan American Games and three medals at the 1955 edition: gold in team foil and bronze in individual foil and team sabre.

References

External links
 

1927 births
2016 deaths
Argentine male fencers
Argentine foil fencers
Olympic fencers of Argentina
Fencers at the 1948 Summer Olympics
Fencers at the 1952 Summer Olympics
Pan American Games medalists in fencing
Pan American Games gold medalists for Argentina
Pan American Games silver medalists for Argentina
Pan American Games bronze medalists for Argentina
Fencers at the 1951 Pan American Games
Fencers from Buenos Aires
Medalists at the 1951 Pan American Games
Medalists at the 1955 Pan American Games